The Victoria Falls Stock Exchange (VFEX) is a small stock exchange headquartered in Victoria Falls, Zimbabwe. It was established in 2020 as a subsidiary of the Zimbabwe Stock Exchange (ZSE) to operate in the Victoria Falls special economic zone. The VFEX's trading currency is in United States Dollars allowing the exchange to shield investors from exchange control risk.

See also 

 Economy of Zimbabwe
 List of stock exchanges
 List of African stock exchanges

References 

Stock exchanges in Africa
Companies established in 2020

2020 establishments in Zimbabwe
Companies listed on the Victoria Falls Stock Exchange